This is a list of members of the Victorian Legislative Assembly from 2002 to 2006:

Members of the Parliament of Victoria by term
21st-century Australian politicians
Victorian Legislative Assembly